Robert Samuel Stallings (August 15, 1927 – June 6, 2012) was an American politician in the state of Tennessee. Stallings served in the Tennessee House of Representatives as a Democrat from the 80th District from 1975 to 1991 (89th, 90th, 91st, 92nd, 93rd, 94th, 95th and 96th General Assemblies). A native of Bolivar, Tennessee, he was an agricultural product dealer. He was succeeded by Republican Page Walley.

References

1927 births
2012 deaths
Democratic Party members of the Tennessee House of Representatives
People from Bolivar, Tennessee